Dutch Suratte, officially Nederlandse vestiging van Suratte (Dutch settlement in Surat), was a directorate of the Dutch East India Company between 1616 and 1795, with its main factory in the city of Surat. Surat was an important trading city of the Mughal Empire on the river Tapti, and the Portuguese had been trading there since 1540. In the early 17th century, Portuguese traders were displaced by English and Dutch traders.

Due to internal unrest in the Mughal Empire, Surat's trade with the Mughal capital of Agra gradually declined in the early 18th century, with most trade shifting to Bombay, the new capital of the English Western Presidency. The city became part of British India as a consequence of the Third Carnatic War (1756–1763). While traders of the Dutch East India Company continued trading in Surat, they had become subordinate to the English.

The Dutch possessions in Surat were occupied by British forces in 1795 by instruction of Dutch stadtholder William V, who wanted to prevent revolutionary France from taking possession of the Dutch holdings in Asia. It was restored to the Dutch in 1818, but again ceded to the English in 1825, owing to the provisions of the Anglo-Dutch Treaty of 1824.

History

Pieter van den Broecke established a Dutch trading post in Suratte in 1616, after previous efforts had failed in the years before. The Dutch East India Company was compelled to form this post after the sultan of Aceh no longer allowed them to buy cheap cotton on the local market. In 1668, Dutch and English traders were joined by the French, who established their first trading post on the Indian subcontinent there.

In 1691, Hendrik van Rheede, administrator of the Dutch East India Company, died on his way from Kochi in Dutch Malabar to Suratte. He was buried with much pomp and circumstance on the Dutch-Armenian cemetery of Surat.

By 1759, the Dutch East India Company's trade had fallen substantially. Trade had largely moved to British Bombay, with Suratte playing only a subordinate role. Due to the provisions of the Kew Letters, Dutch Suratte came under English protection in 1795, who promised to restore it to the Dutch upon the restoration of peace in Europe. Initially, the English allowed the Dutch to continue their trade and even permitted them to fly the Dutch flag on their factories, but in February 1797, the English flag replaced the Dutch flag, and three months later, the last Dutch military forces left the city.

The Treaty of Amiens of 1802 was supposed to restore Dutch Suratte to Dutch rule, leading the Dutch to send a commission under the leadership of Carl Ludwig Maximilian van Albedyll to take possession of the Dutch factory in Suratte. However, before Suratte could be restored to the Dutch, hostilities in Europe had resumed, and Van Albedyll and his company were made prisoners of war on 30 August 1803. Van Albedyll died less than a year later while still imprisoned, on 12 August 1804.

When the Anglo-Dutch Treaty of 1814 again restored the Dutch possessions in Suratte to Dutch rule, Van Albedyll's son Conrad Josef Gustaf van Albedyll, who had traveled to Surat as part of the commission under the leadership of his father, was installed as the new resident of Dutch Suratte on 1 May 1818. He remained in office until Dutch Suratte was again relinquished to the British by the Anglo-Dutch Treaty of 1824, which divided East Asia into Dutch and British spheres of influence.

Legacy 
Surat still has a Dutch-Armenian cemetery, which features the mausoleum of Hendrik van Rheede. Bharuch has remnants of the Dutch lodge and a Dutch cemetery. Agra features a mausoleum for Jan Willem Hessing (1739–1803), a Dutch soldier who became a military adviser to Maharaja Mahadaji Shinde.

Trading posts

Image Gallery

See also
 Dutch India
 Dutch Malabar
 Dutch Ceylon
 Dutch Coromandel
 Dutch Bengal
 François Caron
 Mattheus de Haan
 Hubert Hugo
 Hendrik van Rheede
 Willem Verstegen
 Hendrick Zwaardecroon

Notes

References

External links 
 http://www.vocsite.nl/geschiedenis/handelsposten/suratte.html
 http://www.swaen.com/antique-map-of.php?id=1214
 http://www.voc-kenniscentrum.nl/prod-suiker.html

Dutch Suratte
Dutch India
Dutch East India Company
Former Dutch colonies
Former trading posts of the Dutch East India Company
Former settlements and colonies of the Dutch East India Company
History of Gujarat
1616 establishments in Dutch India
1825 disestablishments in Dutch India